Dan Den is a cuban music timba group founded by Juan Carlos Alfonso in late 1988. It has toured the world.

Discography
Siempre hay un ojo que te ve (1990)
Amame con tu experiencia (1992)
Más rollo que película (1992)
Viejo Lázaro (1993) awarded best instrumentalist at the Feria de Cali
Aprovechando la cobertura (1994)
Dale al que no te dió (1994)
Son cubano a lo Dan Den (1995) (EGREM)
Mi cuerpo (1996) (Fania Records)
Salsa en ataré (1997)
Mecánica guapa (1998)
Grandes éxitos (2000) (EGREM)
Dale campanas (2002) (EGREM) EGREM Prize revelation of the year 2003 by cubadisco
Pasión (2004)

External links
Official Site

Cuban musical groups
Fania Records artists
Musical groups established in 1988
1988 establishments in North America